PK-35 Vantaa (formerly Pallokerho-35 or PK-35) is a football club based in Vantaa, Finland. The club is "dedicated to women's football" and its representative team plays in the Kansallinen Liiga, the top-tier women's league in Finland (called the Naisten Liiga, 2006–2019). PK-35 Vantaa has won the Finnish Championship six times and the Finnish Women's Cup four times. The club's home ground is the Myyrmäen jalkapallostadion (Myyrmäki Football Stadium) in the Myyrmäki district of Vantaa.

The club had a men's representative team from 1935 until 2016, which last played in the 2016 season of the Veikkausliiga.

History

Club origins 
The club's founding can be traced to 19 September 1935, when a group of 36 footballers gathered in Vyborg, which was part of Finland at that time, to establish Vyborg Ball Club (ViPK). The club remained in operation until 1939, when the Winter War and World War II forced the club to disband. Many club members resettled in Helsinki in the period during and after the wars and, in 1948, the club was reinstated in Helsinki under the new name, Pallokerho-35 (PK-35).

PK-35 Women's team 
PK-35 women's representative team was established in 1978 and it first appeared in a Football Association of Finland league in 1982. In 1992, the team reached the qualifiers for the second-flight Naisten I-divisoona (renamed Naisten Ykkönen in 1996) but did not qualify for the league at that time. The team played in the Naisten Ykkönen during the 1999 season and in the third-tier Naisten Kakkonen during 2003–2007. At the end of the 2007 season, under head coach Mitri Pakkanen, the team gained promotion to the Ykkönen. PK-35 finished the 2008 season fourth in the Ykkönen.

Move to Vantaa 

At the end of the 2008 season, the PK-35 men’s and women’s representative teams were relocated to Vantaa, where they became the representative teams of the newly-created club, PK-35 Vantaa. The transfer was done in the hope that the teams would have access to better resources in Vantaa. However, junior and representative team activities carried on in Helsinki and the Helsinki-based PK-35 women’s team continued in the fourth-tier Naisten Kolmonen.

Promotion to Naisten Liiga 
In the 2009 season, the primary goal for the women’s team was to gain promotion to the top-tier Naisten Liiga (renamed the Kansallinen Liiga (National League) in 2020). Newly appointed head coach Pauliina Miettinen took charge of a squad bolstered by strong international players, featuring Ifeanyi Chiejine and goalkeeper Rachael Ayegba of Nigeria, and Jenae Seppälä (née Gibbens) and Natalie Capuano of the United States, as weil as promising young Finnish talent, including Pirjo Leppikangas, Aino Lehtinen, and Sanna Saarinen. The club‘s efforts paid off and PK-35 Vantaa beat FC Sport Vaasa to claim first place in the 2009 Naisten Ykkönen, earning promotion for the upcoming Naisten Liiga season.

The team won the Naisten Liiga for the first time in 2010, in their debut season in the championship. They thus made their UEFA Champions League debut in the 2011–12 season, where they were knocked out by Rayo Vallecano Femenino in the Round of 32.

PK-35 subsequently consolidated itself as the new leading Finnish team, winning both the league championship and the Finnish Women's Cup in 2011, 2012, and 2016.

Honours

Titles

 Finnish Champions (7): 2010, 2011, 2012, 2014, 2015, 2016, 2018
 Finnish Women's Cup (4): 2011, 2012, 2013, 2016

UEFA competition record

Players

2022 squad

Former internationals
  Colombia: Lady Andrade
  Finland: Jaana Lyytikäinen
  New Zealand: Emma Kete
  Nigeria: Cynthia Uwak

References

External links

Official website 

Women's football clubs in Finland
Sport in Vantaa
1978 establishments in Finland